Avigad is a given name and surname. Notable people with the name include:

Avigad Vonshak (born 1947), Israeli biologist
Gad Avigad (born 1930), Israeli biochemist
Jeremy Avigad (born 1968), American philosopher
Nahman Avigad (1905–1992), Israeli archaeologist